The 2003 CAF Champions League was the 39th of the CAF Champions League, the Africa's premier club football tournament prize organized by the Confederation of African Football (CAF). Enyimba of Nigeria defeated Ismaily of Egypt in the final to win their first title.

Qualifying rounds

Preliminary round

First round

Second round

Group stage

Group A

Group B

Knockout stage

Bracket

Semifinals

Final

Top goalscorers
The top scorers from the 2003 CAF Champions League are as follows:

External links
Champions' Cup 2003 - rsssf.com

 
1
CAF Champions League seasons